Maarten Johannes Arens (born 20 May 1972 in Diemen, North Holland) is a Dutch judoka.
European Champion (1995) in Birmingham in the 86 kg category, 4 times Dutch champion, winner of the 2000 Tournoi de Paris in the 81 kg category. At the Sydney Olympics he finished in 9th place in 81 kg category.

He was a member of Judo club Hans Meester Hoorn till 1992. And after that he became a member of Judo club KENAMJU Haarlem.

Coach 
In 2001 he started as national junior coach of the Dutch Judo Federation, among his pupils: Dex Elmont, Jeroen Mooren and Henk Grol. In 2005 he became head coach of the Dutch Judo Men. He stayed head coach until the Summer Olympics 2016 in Rio de Janeiro. In this period he was personal coach of: Guillaume Elmont, Dex Elmont, Henk Grol, Ruben Houkes and Noel van t End.

After the Dutch Judo Federation has decided to centralize their program, he became head coach men and women and head of the National Training Centrer at Papendal. He was coach of Henk Grol, Marhinde Verkerk and Kim Polling. 
He was also coach of the team with: Benito Maij, JP Bell, Michael Bazynksi, Garmt Zijlstra, Akkie Muilwijk, Zeger van Oirschot and Matthew Purssey

Results  
The results of Arens as coach
2005: Guillaume Elmont and Dennis van der Geest World champion Cairo Egypt, Bronze Mark Huizinga 
2007: Ruben Houkes World champion in Rio de Janeiro Brasil, bronze Guilaume Elmont
2009: Henk Grol Vice- World champion Rotterdam The Netherlands
2010: Dex Elmont and Henk Grol both Vice Worldchampion Tokyo Japan
2011: Dex Elmont vice World champion Paris France
2012: Henk Grol bronze Olympic games London England
2013: Henk Grol Vice World champion and Dex Elmont Bronze Rio de Janeiro Brasil
2018: Guusje Steenhuis Vice World champion Baku Azerbaidjan , Marhinde Verkerk and Juul Franssen Bronze medals (not match coach).
2019: Noel van T End World Champion Tokyo Japan, Juul Franssen, Roy Meyer and Michael Korrel Bronze medals (not match coach).

Achievements

Trivia
Arens got promoted to 6th dan on 27 November 2011.

References

External links
 
 
 
 Dutch Olympic Committee

1972 births
Living people
Dutch male judoka
Judoka at the 2000 Summer Olympics
Olympic judoka of the Netherlands
People from Diemen
Sportspeople from North Holland
20th-century Dutch people
21st-century Dutch people